Egypt's Unity is an alliance of political parties that intended to run in the Egyptian 2015 parliamentary election.

References

2015 establishments in Egypt
Political party alliances in Egypt
Organizations established in 2015